L'Indigné (The Rebel) is a 20-CD box set compilation of the recorded studio albums of Léo Ferré for Barclay Records between 1960 and 1974. The limited edition box set was released to mark the 20th anniversary of Ferré's death. The box set brings for the first time together 18 albums remastered from the original records. Live albums and lyrics are not included.

The box set includes 4 never before released songs, 12 unreleased alternatives versions, 17 tracks never released on CD, and a 27 minutes self-portrait of Ferré, taken from Europe 1 station archives. Also included is an illustrated booklet with various pictures, testimonies and interviews of his arranger Jean-Michel Defaye, his photograph Patrick Ullmann, and some more or less heir singers like Bernard Lavilliers, Hubert-Félix Thiéfaine and Cali.

Track listing 
CD 1 Paname (tracks 1-8, 1960) / Les Chansons d'Aragon (tracks 9-18, 1961)
 Paname
 Merde à Vauban
 Les Poètes
 La Maffia
 Jolie môme
 Comme à Ostende
 Quand c'est fini ça recommence
 Si tu t'en vas
 L'Affiche rouge
 Tu n'en reviendras pas
 Est-ce ainsi que les hommes vivent ?
 Il n'aurait fallu
 Les Fourreurs
 Blues
 Elsa
 L'Étrangère
 Je chante pour passer le temps
 Je t'aime tant
 BONUS: Paname (single version)

CD 2 Les Chansons interdites... et autres (1961)
 Miss guéguerre 
 Les Rupins 
 Thank you Satan 
 Les Quat'cent coups 
 Pacific blues 
 Regardez-les 
 Mon général 
 La Gueuse 
 Les Femmes 
 Ta parole 
 Les Parisiens 
 L'amour 
 Vingt ans 
 Nous deux
 Les Temps difficiles (1st studio version)
 Les Chéris 
 Le Vent
 Chanson mécanisée

CD 3 La Langue française (1962)
 La Langue française
 Les Bonnes manières
 La Vieille pèlerine
 Ça t'va
 E.P. Love
 Mister Giorgina
 T'es chouette
 Ça s'lève à l'Est
 Plus jamais
 La Vie est louche
 Les Tziganes
 T'es rock, coco !

CD 4 Ferré 64 (1964)
 C'est le printemps
 La Gauloise
 Le Marché du poète
 Mon piano
 Les Retraités
 Franco la muerte
 Titi de Paris
 La Mélancolie
 Épique époque
 Tu sors souvent la mer
 Sans façon
 Quand j'étais môme

CD 5 Verlaine et Rimbaud (1964)
 Écoutez la chanson bien douce
 Chanson de la plus haute tour
 Il patinait merveilleusement
 Mon rêve familier
 Soleils couchants
 Les Assis
 L'espoir luit comme un brin de paille dans l'étable
 Art poétique
 Pensionnaires
 Âme, te souvient-il ?
 Le Buffet
 Les Poètes de sept ans
 Chanson d'automne
 Les Corbeaux
 Green
 Mes petites amoureuses
 Je vous vois encor
 L'étoile a pleuré rose
 Ô triste, triste était mon âme
 Clair de lune
 Rêvé pour l'hiver
 Les Chercheuses de poux
 Ma Bohème
 Sérénade

CD 6 Léo Ferré 1916-19... (1965–66)
 La Chanson des amants
 Ni Dieu ni maître
 L'Enfance
 Monsieur Barclay
 La Poésie
 Le Palladium
 La Faim
 La Complainte de la télé
 La Mort
 Beau saxo
 On s'aimera
 Les Romantiques
 C'est la vie
 La Grève
 Paris spleen
 L'Âge d'or
 BONUS: Nous deux (alternate version)
 BONUS: Les Temps difficiles (2nd studio version)
 BONUS: Les Tziganes (alternate version)
 BONUS: Plus jamais (alternate version)

CD 7 Cette chanson (1967)
 Cette chanson
 La Marseillaise
 Ils ont voté
 Quartier Latin
 À une chanteuse morte 
 La Banlieue
 On n'est pas des Saints
 Salut, beatnik !
 Le Bonheur
 C'est un air
 Les Gares, les Ports
 Le Lit
 BONUS : Cette chanson (single version)

CD 8 Léo Ferré chante Baudelaire (1967)
 Spleen
 À une Malabaraise
 L'Étranger
 Tu mettrais l'univers
 Le Chat (never released on CD before)
 Le Soleil
 Le Vin de l'assassin
 L'Albatros
 À une passante
 Le Flacon
 La Servante au grand cœur
 Abel et Caïn
 La Géante
 Remords posthume
 Les Bijoux
 La Musique
 La Beauté
 Causerie
 Recueillement
 La Muse vénale
 Ciel brouillé
 Une charogne
 Le Vert paradis (Moesta et Errabunda)

CD 9 L'Été 68 (1969) 
 La Nuit
 Madame la misère
 Pépée
 L'Été 68
 L'Idole
 Le Testament
 C'est extra
 Les Anarchistes
 A toi
 Comme une fille

CD 10 Les Douze Premières Chansons de Léo Ferré (1969)
 À Saint-Germain-des-Prés
 Flamenco de Paris
 Monsieur Tout-Blanc
 L'Inconnue de Londres
 Les Forains
 La Vie d'artiste
 La Chanson du scaphandrier
 L'Esprit de famille
 Barbarie
 Le Temps des roses rouges
 Le Bateau espagnol
 L'Île Saint-Louis

CD 11 Amour Anarchie (1970)
 Le Chien
 Petite
 Poète, vos papiers !
 La Lettre
 La "The nana"
 La Mémoire et la Mer
 Rotterdam
 Paris, je ne t'aime plus
 Le Crachat

CD 12 Amour Anarchie (1970)
 Psaume 151
 L'Amour fou
 La Folie
 Écoute-moi
 Cette blessure
 Le Mal
 Paris c'est une idée
 Les Passantes
 Sur la scène
 Avec le temps
 L'Adieu

CD 13 La Solitude  (1971)
 La Solitude
 Les Albatros
 Ton style
 Faites l'amour
 A mon enterrement
 Les Pop
 Tu ne dis jamais rien
 Dans les "Night"
 Le Conditionnel de variétés
 BONUS: La Vie d'artiste (alternate version)
 BONUS: La Solitude (orchestral version)
 BONUS: La Solitude (alternate mix)

CD 14 La Chanson du mal-aimé (1972)
 La Chanson du mal-aimé

CD 15 La Solitudine (1972)
 I pop
 Piccina
 Peppe
 La solitudine
 Niente piu
 Gli anarchici
 Il tuo stile 
 Tu non dici mai niente 
 Col tempo
 BONUS: Verra la morte (text: Cesare Pavese)
 BONUS: L'uomo solo (text: Cesare Pavese)
 BONUS: I poeti (unreleased)
 BONUS: La notte (unreleased)
 BONUS: La solitudine (orchestral version never released on CD)	
 BONUS: T'amavo tanto sai... (never released on CD)
 BONUS: Alla scuola della poesia (never released on CD)
 BONUS: É la fine (unreleased alternate translation of Niente piu)
 BONUS: La solitudine (unreleased alternate version)

CD 16 Il n'y a plus rien (1973)
 Préface
 Ne chantez pas la mort
 Night and day
 Richard
 L'Oppression
 Il n'y a plus rien

CD 17 Et... basta ! (1973)
 Et... basta !
 Ni Dieu ni maître

CD 18 L'Espoir (1974)
 L'Espoir
 La Damnation
 Les Oiseaux du malheur
 Je t'aimais bien, tu sais...
 Les Amants tristes
 Les Étrangers
 Les Souvenirs
 Marie
 BONUS: L'Espoir (unreleased instrumental rehearsal version)

CD 19 "Live cuts and rarities"

At L'Alhambra, 1961:
 Cannes-la-braguette (never recorded in the studio)
 Les Temps difficiles (1st version)
 Est-ce ainsi que les hommes vivent ? (alternate version)
 Nous les filles (never recorded in the studio)
At Théâtre de l'ABC, 1962:
 T'as payé (never recorded in the studio)
 Les Temps difficiles (2nd version)
 Stances (never recorded in the studio - Text : Pierre de Ronsard)
 Les Temps difficiles (3rd version, 1966)
At Bobino, January 1969 (EP never released on CD):
 Les Anarchistes	
 La Révolution (never recorded in the studio)
 L'Été 68
 Comme une fille	
 Ils ont voté
At Bobino, February 1969 (extracts from double LP Récital 1969 en public à Bobino):
 La Banlieue (alternate version)
 Marizibil (never recorded in the studio)
 La Révolution (never recorded in the studio - alternate version)
 Le Printemps des poètes (never recorded in the studio)
EP Un chien à la Mutualité, 1969:
 Le Chien 
 Paris je ne t'aime plus
 Le Crachat
At L'Olympia, 1972:
 La Fleur de l'âge (never recorded in the studio)
 Mister the wind (never recorded in the studio)

CD 20 BONUS: Previously unreleased songs and rarities
 La poésie fout l'camp, Villon ! 
 L'Âge d'or (alternate instrumental version)
 Y'en a marre 
 Chanson pour elle
 La "The nana" (alternate instrumental version)
 La "The nana" (alternate version)
 Thème de l'Albatros (unreleased on CD)
 Valse de la jeune fille au bal (unreleased on CD)
 L'Albatros (thème symphonique) (unreleased on CD)
 La Solitude (alternate version)
 Ton style (alternate version)
 Ni Dieu, ni maître, ni fric 
 Le Bateau espagnol (alternate version)
 Radio self-portraits by Léo Ferré on Europe 1 (January 1961)

References 

Léo Ferré albums
2013 compilation albums
French-language compilation albums
Universal Music Group compilation albums
Barclay (record label) compilation albums